Velan may refer to:

Surname
 Isari Velan
 Chris Velan
 Petit Vélan
 Yves Velan, Swiss writer

Film
 Velan (film), a 2021 Indian Tamil-language film

Other uses
 Velan, a non-Brahmanical priest associated with Hindu deity, Murugan
 Velan, a character in the 2011 Tamil film Osthe